Imsil County (Imsil-gun) is a county in North Jeolla Province, South Korea. Imsil County is a county in central South Jeolla Province, South Korea. It is an area upstream of the Seomjingang River in the Noryeong Mountains, and there is a basin that runs southeast to Namwon. The county office is located in Imsil-eup, and the administrative district is 11 myeon, 1eup.

It is approximately 30 minutes south of Jeonju by car or bus. Domestic Korean cheese was first produced in Imsil County.  Imsil County encompasses several important towns, mountains and natural areas.

Imsil-gun has 14 elementary schools and an English center.

Imsil Cheese Village
Imsil Cheese Village is located near the town of Imsil (within the county of Imsil). It offers vacation programs for children and tourists to learn how to make cheese.

The cheese produced there is called Imsil cheese, following the county name. Imsil cheese is the unusual mission legacy of a Catholic priest from Belgium who took the Korean name of Ji Junghwan. He arrived in the farming village of Imsil, in the mid-1950s, when the economy was still shattered from the Korean war. He started a farmers’ milk cooperative, which eventually became the Imsil Cheese Factory. The factory still exists today and produces high-quality cheese and yogurt for the Korean market.

A pizza franchise using Imsil cheese has become a widespread business in South Korea since 2004, under the name of Imsil Cheese Pizza. Nearby livestock farms produce the dairy products required for the manufacture of the cheese.

The village is in a rural area, with one bus arriving there every hour. The buses stop running at 8 p.m. Buses to Imsil depart from the Shi-Hae intercity bus terminal in Jeonju. 

Yewon Arts University is located in Imsil.

Climate

Twin towns – sister cities
Imsil is twinned with:

  Gangseo-gu, South Korea
  Eunpyeong-gu, South Korea
  Busanjin-gu, South Korea

References

External links
 County government home page

 
Counties of North Jeolla Province